The Greek Orthodox Patriarchate of Alexandria and all Africa, also known as the Greek Orthodox Church of Alexandria, is an autocephalous patriarchate that is part of the Eastern Orthodox Church. Its seat is in Alexandria and it has canonical responsibility for the entire African continent.

It is commonly called the Greek or Eastern Orthodox Patriarchate of Alexandria to distinguish it from the Coptic Orthodox Patriarchate of Alexandria, which is part of Oriental Orthodoxy. Members of the Greek Orthodox Patriarchate were once referred to as "Melkites" by non-Chalcedonian Christians because they remained in communion with the Ecumenical Patriarchate of Constantinople after the schism that followed the Council of Chalcedon in 451. Mark the Evangelist is considered the founder of the See, and the Patriarchate's emblem is the Lion of Saint Mark.

The head bishop of the Patriarchate of Alexandria is the Pope and Patriarch of Alexandria and all Africa, currently Theodore II of Alexandria. His full title is "His Most Divine Beatitude the Pope and Patriarch of the Great City of Alexandria, Libya, Pentapolis, Ethiopia, all the land of Egypt, and all Africa, Father of Fathers, Shepherd of Shepherds, Prelate of Prelates, thirteenth of the Apostles, and Judge of the Œcumene". Like the Coptic Orthodox Pope of Alexandria and the Coptic Catholic Patriarch of Alexandria, he claims to have succeeded the Apostle Mark the Evangelist in the office of Bishop of Alexandria, who founded the church in the 1st century, and therefore marked the beginning of Christianity in Africa. It is one of the five ancient patriarchates of the early church, called the Pentarchy. The seat of the patriarchate is the Cathedral of the Annunciation, also known as the Cathedral of Evangelismos, in Alexandria.

History

The history of the Patriarchate of Alexandria includes some of the greatest and most renowned fathers of the Church, especially the histories of Athanasius and Cyril, who were patriarchs of Alexandria at the ecumenical councils of Nicaea and Ephesus respectively. In the schism that was created by the political and Christological controversies at the Council of Chalcedon in 451, the Church of Alexandria split in two. The majority of the native (i.e., Coptic) population did not accede to the Council of Chalcedon, adhering instead to the Miaphysite Christology of the Oriental Orthodox communion, and became known as the Coptic Orthodox Church. A small portion of the Church of Alexandria followed Chalcedonian Christology, and this is called the Greek Orthodox Church of Alexandria, since it used Greek as its liturgical language.  These Greek Chalcedonian believers were loyal to the Eastern Roman Emperor and in communion with the Patriarchs in Rome, Antioch, Constantinople, and Jerusalem.  A healthy correspondence of Eulogius of Alexandria with Gregory the Great of Rome is evident from the fourteen books of Gregory's letters called the Registrum. After the Arab conquest of Egypt in the 7th century – which permanently separated the region from the Byzantine Empire – the Greek Chalcedonians became an isolated minority in the region, even among Christians, and the church has remained small for centuries.  These Alexandrian Christians remained in ecclesiastical communion with the Patriarch of Constantinople who recorded their names in his diptychs, but also with the Pope of Rome. In fact, during the Crusades, they also gave no hint of schism with Rome, since the Greek Patriarch of Alexandria administered holy communion to Latin merchants and prisoners and allowed Latin priests to use their own ritual books. Patriarch Nicholas I ordained a priest for the Latin rite and sent a representative to the Fourth Lateran Council.  The first recorded sign of schism was the Bishop of Rome's appointing a titular Latin Patriarch of Alexandria in 1310.

Diaspora growth in the 19th century
In the 19th century Orthodoxy in Africa began to grow again. One thing that changed this in the 19th century was the Orthodox diaspora. People from Greece, Syria and Lebanon, in particular, went to different parts of Africa, and some established Orthodox Churches. Many Greeks also settled in Alexandria from the 1840s and Orthodoxy began to flourish there again, and schools and printing presses were established.

For a while there was some confusion, especially outside Egypt. As happened in other places, Orthodox immigrants would establish an ethnic "community", which would try to provide a church, school, sporting and cultural associations. They would try to get a priest for the community in the place they had emigrated from, and there was some confusion about which bishops were responsible for these priests.

Eventually, in the 1920s it was agreed that all Orthodox churches in Africa would be under the jurisdiction of the Patriarchate of Alexandria, and so Africa has managed to avoid the jurisdictional confusion that has prevailed in places like America and Australia.

Mission growth in the 20th century
In Africa south of the Sahara most of the growth in Christianity began as a result of mission initiatives by Western Christians; Roman Catholic, Protestant and especially in the 20th century adherents to Western-origin Christian bodies that do not fit into this old dichotomy. These Western-initiated churches were, however, very often tied to Western culture. The Greek missions to African outposts followed Greek-speaking settlers, as with the missions to America and Australia, and still provide cultural links to Greece and the Greek patriarchy in Egypt.

African-initiated churches interested in the various forms of Orthodoxy, but finding it difficult to make contact with historic Orthodoxy in the parts of Africa where they lived, sought further afield. In the 1920s some of them made contact with the so-called African Orthodox Church in the USA (not a part of the canonical community of Eastern Orthodox Churches), notably Daniel William Alexander in South Africa, and Ruben Spartas Mukasa in Uganda.

In the 1930s, Daniel William Alexander visited first Uganda, and later Kenya. Spartas, however, also made contact with Fr Nikodemos Sarikas, a missionary priest in Tanganyika, and through him made contact with the Greek Patriarch of Alexandria. In 1946 the African Orthodox groups in Kenya and Uganda were received into the Greek Orthodox Patriarchate of Alexandria.

In the 1950s, however, the Orthodox Church in Kenya suffered severe oppression at the hands of the British colonial authorities during the Mau Mau Uprising. Most of the clergy were put in concentration camps, and churches and schools were closed. Only the Cathedral in Nairobi (which had a largely Greek membership) remained open. Archbishop Makarios III of Cyprus preached an anti-colonialist sermon at the cathedral on his way home from exile, and this led to friendship between him and the leader of the anti-colonial struggle in Kenya, Jomo Kenyatta.

After Kenya became independent in 1963 the situation eased, and the Greek-speaking Church of Cyprus helped to get the presence of the Greek Orthodox Church in Kenya once more, building a seminary and sending missionary teachers.

Late 20th-early 21st century
In recent years, a considerable missionary effort was enacted by Pope Petros VII. During his seven years as patriarch (1997–2004), he worked tirelessly to spread the Orthodox Christian faith in Arab nations and throughout Africa, raising up native clergy and encouraging the use of local languages in the liturgical life of the church. Particularly sensitive to the nature of Christian expansion into Muslim countries, he worked to promote mutual understanding and respect between Orthodox Christians and Muslims. He also worked to improve ecumenical relations with the Coptic Orthodox Church, signing a joint declaration allowing intermarriage and setting the stage for improved relations between the two ancient patriarchates. His efforts were ended as the result of a helicopter crash on September 11, 2004, in the Aegean Sea near Greece, killing him and several other clergy, including Bishop Nectarios of Madagascar, another bishop with a profound missionary vision. The metropolitans and bishops of this expanding church remain overwhelmingly of Greek or Cypriot origin.

Today, some 300,000 Eastern Orthodox Christians constitute the Patriarchate of Alexandria in Egypt, the highest number since the Roman Empire. The current primate of the Greek Church of Alexandria is Theodoros II, Pope and Patriarch of Alexandria and all Africa.

2019 schism with Moscow
On 27 December 2019 the Russian Orthodox Church officially cut ties with the Eastern Orthodox Patriarchate in Alexandria over the latter's recognition of the Orthodox Church of Ukraine, whose autocephaly is rejected by the Moscow-based church. This was done after Theodore II announced support for the Church of Ukraine. The Holy Synod of the Russian Orthodox Church noted that it remains in communion with clerics of the Alexandria church who reject Theodore II's decision.

Offikialoi of the Throne
The institution of the Offikialoi has its roots in the Hierarchy of the Byzantine Empire and primarily came into the ecclesiastical world around the 9th century, beginning with the Ecumenical patriarchate in Constantinople, where the offices existed hierarchically in three pentads. There are ecclesiastical offices, both for the clergy as well as for lay people. However, the offices for lay people acquired greater validity and dissemination during the Ottoman period whence they were gradually disseminated to the other ancient Patriarchates of the East.

The offices are awarded by "patriarchal esteem and intention" as a recompense to the Patriarchate of Alexandria and all Africa, while in earlier years they were connected to particular positions within the patriarchal court and the administrative mechanism of the Patriarchate, which over the years slackened.

Administrative structures and hierarchy

Patriarch
Patriarch Theodore II (Choreftakis), Pope and Patriarch of the Holy Archdiocese of Alexandria in Egypt, Primate of the Greek Orthodox Patriarchate of Alexandria and All Africa.

Archbishops (Metropolitans)
Metropolitan Narcissus (Gammo) of the Holy Archdiocese of Accra with jurisdiction over Burkina Faso, Cote d'Ivoire, Gambia, Ghana, Guinea, Guinea-Bissau, Liberia, and Mali
Metropolitan Peter (Giakoumelos) of the Holy Archdiocese of Axum, seated in Addis Ababa with jurisdiction over the Horn of Africa
Metropolitan Gennadius (Stantzios) of the Holy Archdiocese of Botswana
Metropolitan Pantaleon (Arathymos) of the Holy Archdiocese of Brazzaville and Gabon, with jurisdiction over the Congo and Gabon
Metropolitan Gregory (Stergiou) of the Holy Archdiocese of Cameroon with jurisdiction over Cameroon, the Central African Republic, Chad, Equatorial Guinea and São Tomé and Príncipe
Metropolitan Meletius (Koumanis) of the Holy Archdiocese of Carthage, seated in Tunis with jurisdiction over Algeria, Mauritania, Morocco, and Tunisia
Metropolitan Demetrius (Zacharengas) of the Holy Archdiocese of Dar es Salaam with jurisdiction over eastern Tanzania and the Seychelles
Metropolitan Sergius (Kykkotis) of the Holy Archdiocese of Good Hope, seated in Cape Town with jurisdiction over the South African provinces of the Eastern, Northern, and Western Cape, KwaZulu-Natal, and Free State as well as Lesotho, Namibia, and Swaziland
Metropolitan Nicholas (Antoniou) of the Holy Archdiocese of Hermopolis, seated in Tanta with jurisdiction over the Arabic-speaking Orthodox Christians of Egypt
Metropolitan Damascene (Papandreou) of the Holy Archdiocese of Johannesburg and Pretoria with jurisdiction over northeastern South Africa
Metropolitan Jonah (Lwanga) of the Holy Archdiocese of Kampala with jurisdiction over Uganda
Metropolitan Meletius (Kamiloudis) of the Holy Archdiocese of Katanga, seated in Lubumbashi in the Democratic Republic of the Congo
Metropolitan Nicephorus (Konstantinou) of the Holy Archdiocese of Kinshasa with jurisdiction over the Democratic Republic of the Congo
Metropolitan Gabriel (Raftopoulos) of the Holy Archdiocese of Leontopolis, seated in Ismailia with jurisdiction over northeastern Egypt
Metropolitan Ignatius (Sennis) of the Holy Archdiocese of Madagascar with jurisdiction over Madagascar, the Comoros, Mayotte, Mauritius, and Réunion
Metropolitan Nicodemus (Priangelos) of the Holy Archdiocese of Memphis, seated in Heliopolis
Metropolitan Jerome (Muzeeyi) of the Holy Archdiocese of Mwanza, seated in Bukoba with jurisdiction over western Tanzania
Metropolitan Macarius (Telyridis) of the Holy Archdiocese of Nairobi with jurisdiction over Kenya
Metropolitan Alexander (Gianniris) of the Holy Archdiocese of Nigeria with jurisdiction over Nigeria, Niger, Benin and Togo.
Metropolitan Savvas (Cheimonetos) of the Holy Archdiocese of Nubia, seated in Khartoum with jurisdiction over Sudan and South Sudan
Metropolitan Nephon (Tsavaris) of the Holy Archdiocese of Pelusium, seated in Port Said
Metropolitan Emmanuel (Kagias) of the Holy Archdiocese of Ptolemais, seated in Minya with jurisdiction over Upper Egypt
Metropolitan Theophylact (Tzoumerkas) of the Holy Archdiocese of Tripoli with jurisdiction over Libya
Metropolitan Yohanis (Ιιοανις)(Tsaftaridis) of the Holy Archdiocese of Zambia, Mozambique and Malawi, seated in Lusaka
Metropolitan Seraphim (Iakovou) of the Holy Archdiocese of Zimbabwe and Angola, seated in Harare
Metropolitan Innocentius (Byakatonda) of the Holy Archdiocese of Burundi and Rwanda

Bishops
Bishop Chrysostome (Karagounis) of the Holy Diocese of Mozambique
Bishop Neophytos (Kongai) of the Holy Diocese of Nyeri and Mount Kenya
Bishop Athanasius (Akunda) of the Holy Diocese of Kisumu and Western Kenya(Posthumously)
Bishop Agathonicus (Nikolaidis) of the Holy Diocese of Arusha and Central Tanzania
Bishop Silvestros (Kisitu) of the Holy Diocese of (Gulu) and eastern Uganda

Greek Orthodox Churches in Egypt 
List of Greek Orthodox Churches in Egypt

 St. Constantine and St. Helena Church – Cairo
 St. Spyridon Church – Helwan
 Patriarchal Monastery of St. George – Old Cairo
 St. Nicholas Church, Heliopolis
 Church of the Archangels in Al-Zahir
 Our Lady of El Nayah Church – Alexandria
 St. Anthony the Great Shatby – Alexandria
 The Annunciation of the Virgin Mary Church – Mansheya, Alexandria
 Patriarchal Monastery of Saint Savvas of the Blessed Virgin of Alexandria
 Church of the Entry of Christ into the Temple – Tanta
 St. George Church – Tanta
 Saint Nicholas Church – Mansoura
 Saint Nicholas Church – Port Said 
 St. Nicholas Church – Old Patriarchate, Damietta

See also 

List of Greek Orthodox Patriarchs of Alexandria
Greek Orthodox Church
Greeks in Egypt
Syro-Lebanese in Egypt

References

Literature

External links
The Patriarchate of Alexandria (Official Site)
Archdiocese of Lagos (Official Site)
Archdiocese of Mwanza  (Official Site)
Uganda Orthodox Church (Official Site)
Orthodox Church of Kenya (Official Site)
Orthodox Church in Tanzania (Official Site)
Orthodox Archbishopric of Good Hope, Cape Town  (Official Site)
Website of the Arabic-speaking Alexandrian Orthodox Christians of Egypt
CNEWA Profile of the Alexandrian Orthodox Church by Ronald Roberson